Fritz Albert Lipmann (June 12, 1899 – July 24, 1986) was a German-American biochemist and a co-discoverer in 1945 of coenzyme A. For this, together with other research on coenzyme A, he was awarded the Nobel Prize in Physiology or Medicine in 1953 (shared with Hans Adolf Krebs).

Early life and education
Lipmann was born in Königsberg, Germany, to a Jewish family. His parents were Gertrud (Lachmanski) and Leopold Lipmann, an attorney.

Lipmann studied medicine at the University of Königsberg, Berlin, and Munich, graduating in Berlin in 1924. He returned to Königsberg to study chemistry under Professor Hans Meerwein. In 1926 he joined Otto Meyerhof at the Kaiser Wilhelm Institute for Biology, Dahlem, Berlin, for his doctoral thesis. After that he followed Meyerhof to Heidelberg to the Kaiser Wilhelm Institute for Medical Research.

Career
From 1939 on, Lipmann lived and worked in the United States. He was a Research Associate in the Department of Biochemistry, Cornell University Medical College, New York from 1939 to 1941. He joined the research staff of the Massachusetts General Hospital in Boston in 1941, first as a Research Associate in the Department of Surgery, then heading his own group in the Biochemical Research Laboratory of the hospital. From 1949 to 1957 he was professor of biological chemistry at Harvard Medical School. From 1957 onwards, he taught and conducted research at Rockefeller University, New York City.

In 1953, Lipmann received one half of the Nobel Prize in Physiology and Medicine "for his discovery of co-enzyme A and its importance for intermediary metabolism." The other half of the award was won by Hans Adolf Krebs. Lipmann was awarded the National Medal of Science in 1966. He would try to dive further into his discovery by finding a variant of co-enzyme A, now known as Pantethine. He was an elected member of the American Academy of Arts and Sciences, the United States National Academy of Sciences, and the American Philosophical Society.

Lipmann introduced the specific squiggle designation (~) to indicate high energy-rich phosphate in energy-rich biomolecules like ATP in his essay "Metabolic Generation and Utilization of Phosphate Bond Energy." Of his work, he said "that in the field of biosynthesis we have a rare example of progress leading to simplification."

Personal life

In 1931, Lipmann married Elfreda M. Hall. They had one son. Lipmann died in New York in 1986. His widow died in 2008 at the age of 101.

See also
List of Jewish Nobel laureates
Hans Adolf Krebs

References

External links

 
jewish virtual library biography
Leibniz Institute for Age Research – Fritz Lipmann Institute (FLI)
National Academy of Sciences Biographical Memoir

1899 births
1986 deaths
Nobel laureates in Physiology or Medicine
American Nobel laureates
German Nobel laureates
American biochemists
Jewish emigrants from Nazi Germany to the United States
Jewish American scientists
Jewish chemists
Scientists from Königsberg
People from East Prussia
University of Königsberg alumni
Humboldt University of Berlin alumni
Physicians of the Charité
Ludwig Maximilian University of Munich alumni
Heidelberg University alumni
Harvard Medical School faculty
National Medal of Science laureates
Foreign Members of the Royal Society
Rockefeller University people
Recipients of the Pour le Mérite (civil class)
Members of the American Philosophical Society